Lozove is a village in Starobilsk Raion (district) in Luhansk Oblast of eastern Ukraine, at about 89 km NNW from the centre of Luhansk city.

Demographics

In 2001 the settlement had 59 inhabitants. Native language distribution as of the Ukrainian Census of 2001:
Ukrainian: 93.22%
Russian: 6.78%

References

Villages in Staroblisk Raion